Jenna Long (born November 26, 1985) is an American former professional tennis player. She is now an attorney.

Long grew up in Fremont, California and studied at the University of North Carolina. In her senior year of collegiate tennis, she partnered with Sara Anundsen to win the 2007 NCAA doubles championship.

As the reigning national college champions, Long and Anundsen received a wildcard to compete in the main draw of the 2007 US Open, where they were beaten in the first round of the doubles draw by the Polish pairing of Klaudia Jans and Alicja Rosolska.

ITF finals

Doubles (1–1)

References

External links
 
 

1985 births
Living people
American female tennis players
North Carolina Tar Heels women's tennis players
Tennis people from California
People from Fremont, California